Pat Manson (born November 29, 1967, in West Point, New York) is a retired American pole vaulter, best known for winning three gold medals at the Pan American Games in 1991, 1995 and 1999. He also finished sixth at the 1997 World Championships in Athletics in Athens.

Achievements

References

 

1967 births
Living people
American male pole vaulters
People from West Point, New York
Sportspeople from the New York metropolitan area
Track and field athletes from New York (state)
Athletes (track and field) at the 1991 Pan American Games
Athletes (track and field) at the 1995 Pan American Games
Athletes (track and field) at the 1999 Pan American Games
Pan American Games medalists in athletics (track and field)
Pan American Games gold medalists for the United States
American masters athletes
Goodwill Games medalists in athletics
Competitors at the 1998 Goodwill Games
Medalists at the 1991 Pan American Games
Medalists at the 1995 Pan American Games
Medalists at the 1999 Pan American Games